Christa Siems (1916–1990) was a German film and television actress.

Selected filmography
 Pension Schöller (1960)
 Angels of the Street  (1969)
 Under the Roofs of St. Pauli (1970)
 Moritz, Dear Moritz (1978)

References

Bibliography
 Kaplan, Mike. Variety international showbusiness reference. Garland, 1981.

External links

1916 births
1990 deaths
German television actresses
German film actresses
Actresses from Hamburg